This article represents an overview on the history of Romanians in  Ukraine, including those Romanians of Northern Bukovina, Zakarpattia, the Hertsa region, and Budjak in Odesa Oblast, but also those Romanophones in the territory between the Dniester River and the Southern Buh River, who traditionally have not inhabited any Romanian state (nor Transnistria), but have been an integral part of the history of modern Ukraine, and are considered natives to the area. There is an ongoing controversy whether self-identified Moldovans are part of the larger Romanian ethnic group or a separate ethnicity.

Because of the soviet policies of artificial division of the Romanian speakers, that inhabited the territories occupied by the Soviet Union during the Second World War, and the continuation of those practices by the Ukrainian authorities there is an undergoing identity controversy among the Romanophones of Ukraine. All of those living in the former territories of Bukovina consider themselves to be Romanians, but among those living in the lands of the historical Bessarabia, there is still division as a large part of them still consider themselves to be Moldovans, while many others identify as Romanians. This problem is considered to have worsened due to the poverty, the lack of proper education and the decades long disinformation of the inhabitants.

History

Middle Ages 
Beginning with the 10th century, the territory was slowly infiltrated by Slavic tribes (Ulichs and Tivertsy) from the north, by Romanians (Vlachs) from the west, as well as by Turkic nomads such as Pechenegs, Cumans and (later) Tatars from the east.

Vlachs and Brodniks are mentioned in the area in the 12th and 13th century. As characterised by contemporary sources, the area between the Southern Bug and Dniester had never been populated by a single ethnicity, or totally controlled by Kievan Rus' or other rulers. Ukrainian historian Volodymyr Antonovych writes: "Neither the right bank, nor the left bank of the Dniester have ever belonged to Galician or other Ruthenian princes."

Since the 14th century, the area was intermittently ruled by Lithuanian dukes, Polish kings, Crimean khans, and Moldavian princes (such as Ion Vodă Armeanul). In 1681 George Ducas's title was "Despot of Moldavia and Ukraine", as he was simultaneously Prince of Moldavia and Hetman of Ukraine. Other Moldavian princes who held control of the territory in 17th and 18th centuries were Ştefan Movilă, Dimitrie Cantacuzino, and Mihai Racoviţă.

Modern Age 
The end of the 18th century marked Imperial Russia's colonization of the region, as a result of which large migrations into the region were encouraged, including people of Ukrainian, Russian, and German ethnicity. The process of Russification and colonization of this territory started to be carried out by representatives of other ethnic groups of the Russian Empire.

While the Ruthenian ethnic element is fundamental for Cossacks, some  have claimed a considerable number of Romanians among the hetmans of the Cossacks (i.e. Ioan Potcoavă, Grigore Lobodă (Hryhoriy Loboda), who ruled in 1593–1596), Ioan Sârcu (Ivan Sirko), who ruled in 1659–1660, Dănilă Apostol (Danylo Apostol), who ruled in 1727–1734, Alexander Potcoavă, Constantin Potcoavă, Petre Lungu, Petre Cazacu, Tihon Baibuza, Samoilă Chişcă, Opară, Trofim Voloşanin, Ion Şărpilă, Timotei Sgură, Dumitru Hunu), and other high-ranking Cossacks (Polkovnyks Toader Lobădă and Dumitraşcu Raicea in Pereiaslav, Martin Puşcariu in Poltava, Burlă in Gdańsk, Pavel Apostol in Myrhorod, Eremie Gânju and Dimitrie Băncescu in Uman, Varlam Buhăţel, Grigore Gămălie in Lubensk, Grigore Cristofor, Ion Ursu, Petru Apostol in Lubensk).

After 1812, the Russian Empire annexed Bessarabia from the Ottoman Empire. Romanians under Russian rule enjoyed privileges well, the language of Moldavians was established as an official language in the governmental institutions of Bessarabia, used along with Russian, as 95% of the population was Romanian.

The publishing works established by Archbishop Gavril Bănulescu-Bodoni were able to produce books and liturgical works in Moldovan between 1815 and 1820, until the period from 1871 to 1905, when Russification policies were implemented that all public use of Romanian was phased out, and substituted with Russian. Romanian continued to be used as the colloquial language of home and family, mostly spoken by Romanians, either first or second language.

Many Romanians changed their family names to Russian. This was the era of the highest level of assimilation in the Russian Empire. In 1872, the priest Pavel Lebedev ordered that all church documents be written in Russian, and, in 1882, the press at Chișinău was closed by order of the Holy Synod.

Historically, the Orthodox Church in today's Transnistria and Ukraine was subordinated at first to the Mitropolity of Proilava (modern Brăila, Romania). Later, it belonged to the Bishopric of Huşi. After the Russian annexation of 1792, the Bishopric of Ochakiv reverted to Ekaterinoslav (modern Dnipro). From 1837, it belonged to the Eparchys of Kherson with its seat in Odesa, and Taurida with its seat in Simferopol.

The Soviet Union 
The population of the former Moldavian ASSR, as a part of the Ukrainian Soviet Socialist Republic (Ukrainian SSR), had also suffered the Holodomor, the famine of the 1930s that caused several millions deaths in Ukraine.

Autonomous Moldavian Republic in Soviet Ukraine

At the end of World War I in 1918, the Directory of Ukraine proclaimed the sovereignty of the Ukrainian People's Republic over the left bank of the Dneister. After the end of World War I in 1918, Bukovina (formerly ruled by Austria-Hungary) and Bessarabia were united with Kingdom of Romania; and after the Russian Civil War ended, in 1922, the Ukrainian SSR was created. Bukovina and Bessarabia were historically populated by the Romanians and Ukrainians for hundreds of years.

The very term "Ukrainians" was prohibited from the official usage and some populations of disputable Ukrainian ethnicity were rather called the "citizens of Romania who forgot their native language" and were forced to change their last names to Romanian-sounding ones. Among those who were Romanianized were descendants of Romanians who were assimilated to Ukrainian society in the past.

As such, according to the Romanian census, of the total population of 805,000, 74% were Romanians; the number included the Ukrainians and other possibly related Ukrainian ethnic groups Hutsuls referred to as "Romanians who forgot their native language" Among Russians who were Romanianized in Bessarabia were descendants of Romanians who underwent Russification policies during Russian rule.

The geopolitical concept of an autonomous Transnistrian region was born in 1924, when Bessarabian-Russian military leader Grigory Kotovsky founded, under the auspices of Moscow, the Moldavian Autonomous Oblast, which on 12 October 1924 became the Moldavian ASSR of the Ukrainian SSR.

The intention of Soviet policy was to promote Communism in recently lost Bessarabia and surroundings, and eventually to regain the former province from Romania. (Soviet authorities declared the "temporarily occupied city of Chişinău" as de jure capital of the ASSR.)

Moldavian SSR 

In 1940, under duress from a Soviet ultimatum issued to the Romanian ambassador in Moscow and under pressure from Italy and Germany, Romania ceded Bessarabia and Bukovina to the USSR. As many as 90,000 died as the Red Army entered and occupied the territory on June 28. The official Soviet press declared that the "peaceful policy of the USSR" had "liquidated the [Bessarabian] Soviet-Romanian conflict".

The Moldavian SSR was created from Bessarabia and the western part of the Moldavian ASSR. Bessarabian territory along the Black Sea and Danube, where Romanians were in the minority, was merged into the Ukrainian SSR to ensure its control by a stable Soviet republic. The Romanian population of Ukraine was persecuted by Soviet authorities on ethnic grounds, especially in the years following the annexation until 1956; because of this, Russification laws were imposed again on Romanian population. In neighboring Bessarabia the same persecution did not have a predominantly ethnic orientation, being based mostly on social, educational, and political grounds.

Transnistria (WWII) 
Having allied with Nazi Germany, and having recaptured the territories occupied by the Soviets in 1940, Romanian dictator Antonescu did not heed the counsel of his advisers and continued to wage war on the Soviets beyond Romania's pre-war boundaries, invading parts of Ukraine and occupying the territory between Dniester and Southern Buh rivers. During this period the Romanian and German authorities and units deported to this region 147,000 Bessarabian and Bukovinian Jews, 30,000 Romanian Roma, and exterminated the largest part of the local Jewish population of this region. In 1944, the Soviets re-conquered the area.

Recent past

In post-Soviet times, Ukrainian, the language of the historical ethnic/linguistic majority, is constitutionally the sole state language, and the state system of higher education has been switched to Ukrainian.

In June 1997 Romania and Ukraine signed a bilateral treaty which included addressing territorial and minority issues. By the terms of the agreement, Ukraine guaranteed the rights of Romanians in Ukraine and Romania guaranteed the rights of Ukrainians in Romania. There are schools teaching Romanian as a primary language, along with newspapers, TV, and radio broadcasting in Romanian.

In 2015, several news websites published a report claiming that the Romanians of Northern Bukovina had formed a "Assembly of the Romanians of Bukovina" and demanded the territorial autonomy of the region from Ukraine. However, they were claimed to be fake and a product of pro-Russian anti-Ukrainian websites.

Language and demographics
According to the Soviet 1989 census, Romanian speakers accounted for just under one percent of Ukraine's total population: 134,825 Romanians, and 324,525 Moldovans with the largest minority in Chernivtsi (approximately one fifth of the region's population). According to the U.S. Census Bureau, in 2015, there were 1,438 ethnic Romanians born in Ukraine living in the United States of America. By comparison, there were also 237,809 ethnic Ukrainians born in Ukraine living in the U.S. in that year.

They are not, as of today, allowed to teach Romanian language in Ukrainian state education system. Whereas, the Ukrainian migrants, as well as the ethnic Ukrainians who have lived in Romania for centuries, benefit from Ukrainian language classes in Romania and their state tv is broadcast on Romanian state's television at a chosen prefixed time slot.

Romanian communities in present-day Ukraine

Culture and legacy
Notable Romanians (or individuals with partial Romanian ancestry) in Ukraine include:
 Nikolay Florea - astronomer
 Alexander Marinesko - naval officer
 Igor Moiseyev - choreographer
 Volodymyr Muntyan - footballer
 Serghei Covalciuc - footballer
 Kyrylo Kovalchuk - footballer
 Alina Grosu - singer
 Sofia Rotaru - singer
 Nataliia Lupu - athlete
 Tatiana Gutsu - artistic gymnast
 Nichita Smochină - scholar and political figure
 Eugen Tomac - historian and politician
 Maria Iliuț - folk singer
 Petro Mohyla - Orthodox metropolitan

See also

 Demographics of Ukraine
 Moldovans in Ukraine
 Hertsa region
 Northern Maramureș
 Bessarabia
 Bukovina (Bukovina Day)
 New Serbia, a province in the Russian Empire that had an ethnic Romanian majority
 Slavo-Serbia, another province of the Russian Empire that had a notable minority of Romanian colonists
 Romania–Ukraine relations

References

 Ion Nistor. The History of Romanians in Transnistria
 Charles King. The Moldovans: Romania, Russia, and the Politics of Culture, Hoover Institution Press, Stanford University, 2000. .

External links
  INCONSISTENT LANGUAGE POLICY CREATES PROBLEMS IN UKRAINE, Oleg Varfolomeyev, EURASIA DAILY MONITOR, Volume 3, Issue 101 (May 24, 2006)
 "Interpreting 'Nationality' and 'Language' in the 2001 Ukrainian Census,", Dominique Arel, Post-Soviet Affairs, Vol. 18 No. 3, July–September 2002, pp. 213–249, appearing in JRL #6535
 The Romanian Minority in Ukraine, Ionas Aurelian Rus, Center for Prevention of Conflicts and Early Warning, Policy Paper Nr. 704R, Bucharest, June 2004

 
Romanian diaspora
Romanians, history
Romanian minorities in Europe
Romania–Ukraine relations